Planet Rock Profiles is an Irish-produced and long-running television show consisting of a biographical profile of a band or musician. Created by Eamonn Maguire and initially presented by Dave Fanning, and later by Tom Dunne, Planet Rock Profiles has aired on RTÉ Two, ITV, Channel V, Music Country, VH1 Europe and many other music channels worldwide.

External links
 Official website
 Monster Distributes website

Irish music television shows
1995 Irish television series debuts
ITV (TV network) original programming